Desta Yohannes Egeta (born 17 April 1998) is an Ethiopian professional footballer who plays as a left-back for the Ethiopian club Adama City, and the Ethiopia national team.

International career
Yohannes made his international debut with the Ethiopia national team in a 0–0 friendly tie with Zambia on 5 Augus 2017.

References

External links
 
 

1998 births
Living people
Ethiopian footballers
Ethiopia international footballers
Ethiopian Premier League players
Association football fullbacks
Hawassa City S.C. players
Defence Force S.C. players
Adama City F.C. players
2021 Africa Cup of Nations players